Floriano was a Deodoro-class coastal defense ship built for the Brazilian Navy at the end of the nineteenth century.

Footnotes

Endnotes

Bibliography 
 
 "Floriano." Serviço de Documentação da Marinha — Histórico de Navios. Diretoria do Patrimônio Histórico e Documentação da Marinha, Departamento de História Marítima. Accessed 19 August 2017.

Further reading 
 

Ships of the Brazilian Navy
Marshal Deodoro-class coastal defense ship
1898 ships